is an action video game developed and published by Nintendo. Designed by Yoshio Sakamoto, it was first released as an arcade game for the Nintendo VS. System in 1984, titled Vs. Wrecking Crew and featuring a simultaneous two-player mode. It was released as a single-player game for the Family Computer (Famicom) console in 1985, and as a launch game for the Nintendo Entertainment System (NES) later that year. A sequel, Wrecking Crew '98, was released in Japan in 1998 for the Super Famicom.

Gameplay

The player controls Mario (or Luigi in two-player mode) and attempts to destroy all of a certain set of objects with a large hammer on each of 100 levels. Mario cannot jump because of the hammer's weight. The player can select any level to start on from the title screen. Each level's playfield is divided into an invisible grid, each space of which can contain one object. Objects include these: destructible walls, pillars, and ladders; indestructible barrels and ladders; bombs that destroy all connected destructible objects; and various enemies that Mario must avoid. Doors may be opened to cause enemies to move harmlessly into the background. The game introduced a new character, a construction foreman named Spike, who chases Mario and attempts to disrupt him by knocking down objects and causing him to fall to the bottom of the playfield. The player starts the game with five lives and loses a life whenever Mario comes in contact with an enemy or fireball. The game is over when all lives are lost. The game can also be aborted at any time, and must be aborted if Mario becomes trapped in a barrel.

Because Mario lacks the ability to jump, the player must figure out the optimal order in which to destroy objects—for example, if a player destroys a ladder too soon, a wall may become unreachable and thus the player cannot finish the level. Destroying multiple objects in a row (usually with a chain of bombs) scores extra bonus points, and occasionally bonus items may appear that Mario can collect.

Wrecking Crew features a level editor, which allows the player to design up to four custom levels. They can be saved and loaded using the Famicom Data Recorder, a cassette tape drive. Because this peripheral was only released for Famicom in Japan, other localizations cannot save or load the custom levels. The U.S. manual includes a note stating that the load and save functions "have been programmed in for potential product developments". The feature was reenabled for the game's Wii Virtual Console release using Wii system storage.

Reception 
In Japan, Game Machine listed Vs. Wrecking Crew in its October 1, 1984 issue as the thirteenth most-successful table arcade unit of the month.

Re-releases
Wrecking Crew was re-released in 1989 on the Family Computer Disk System, and in 2004 as the 14th game of the Famicom Mini series on Game Boy Advance. It was also included as a playable bonus game in its sequel, Wrecking Crew '98.

The game was re-released on the Wii Virtual Console in 2007. It was briefly distributed to Nintendo 3DS owners in September 2011 as part of the "Ambassador Program", before being made available for general sale on 3DS Virtual Console in Japan in September 2012, with a release in other territories following in 2013. Wrecking Crew was also released on the Wii U Virtual Console in June 2013. All Virtual Console releases, excluding the 3DS version, support saving custom level designs, which is not possible in the original NES version of the game.

Sequel

 is an action puzzle game released exclusively in Japan in 1998 for the Super Famicom's Nintendo Power download service, and later on cartridge. Unlike the original, in which the player's objective is to find ways to clear each level of all panels, Wrecking Crew '98 takes a more competitive approach: Various blocks and colored panels appear on each player's side of the screen, and the player must attempt to line up three or more panels of the same color to remove them. When a set of panels disappears, all blocks and panels above it will drop, potentially allowing the player to create chain combos. Clearing four or more panels of the same color will trigger an attack that hinders the opponent; each panel color will produce a different type of attack. The match ends when one player's screen becomes filled with panels, causing them to lose.

The game's story features Mario returning to the Mushroom Kingdom after a trip, only to discover that Bowser has started a constructing multiple new high-rise bases, depriving the surrounding flora of sunlight. To stop Bowser, Mario retrieves his magic hammer from his time on the Wrecking Crew and begins demolishing Bowser's bases. At each location, he encounters a member of Bowser's construction crew whom he must defeat to destroy the base, including his former rival Foreman Spike.

The main single player mode is Story mode, in which the player controls Mario and travels through an overworld, entering each of Bowser's construction sites and defeating a rival opponent. Completing each stage within a time limit will unlock several secret stages and an alternate ending. Clearing stages in Story mode will unlock up to 12 total playable characters for use in Versus mode, a competitive mode for one to two players. Clearing the Story also unlocks Tournament mode, in which eight characters compete in a single-elimination tournament until only one remains and is declared the champion. A playable port of the original Wrecking Crew is also accessible from the main menu.

The game was re-released for the Wii U Virtual Console in Japan on September 28, 2016. A fanmade English translation patch for the game was released in October 2017.

Legacy
The Bonus Stage theme from Wrecking Crew was remixed for Dance Dance Revolution: Mario Mix (2005). The Golden Hammer as a usable item in the Super Smash Bros. series, beginning with Super Smash Bros. Brawl (2008). A "Wrecking Crew" stage also appears in Super Smash Bros. for Wii U (2014) and Super Smash Bros. Ultimate (2018).

Spike is set to reappear in The Super Mario Bros. Movie (2023), voiced by Sebastian Maniscalco. This version will be portrayed as the former boss of Mario and Luigi before they started their own plumbing business.

See also
Electrician (1984)
List of Nintendo Entertainment System games

Notes

References

External links
 Wrecking Crew at NinDB

1984 video games
1985 video games
Arcade video games
Famicom Disk System games
Game Boy Advance games
Intelligent Systems games
Mario puzzle games
Mario video games
Nintendo Entertainment System games
Nintendo Switch Online games
Pax Softnica games
Video games developed in Japan
Virtual Console games for Wii
Virtual Console games for Nintendo 3DS
Virtual Console games for Wii U
Video games scored by Hirokazu Tanaka
Video games designed by Yoshio Sakamoto
Multiplayer and single-player video games